The 2001–02 SK Rapid Wien season is the 104th season in club history.

Squad statistics

Goal scorers

Fixtures and results

Bundesliga

League table

Cup

UEFA Cup

References

2001-02 Rapid Wien Season
Austrian football clubs 2001–02 season